The 1975 Trans-Am Series was the tenth running of the Sports Car Club of America's premier series. All races except for the Six Hours of Watkins Glen ran for approximately one hundred miles. 

The Drivers Championship was won by John Greenwood and the Manufacturers title was awarded to Chevrolet.

Results

Note: The Six Hours of Watkins Glen was also a round of the 1975 World Championship for Makes, and was won outright by Henri Pescarolo and Derek Bell driving an Alfa Romeo 33TT12. Headley & Missuriello were the best placed of the Trans Am competitors.

References

Trans-Am Series
Trans-Am